Josiah Coatney (born January 4, 1996) is an American football defensive tackle for the Arlington Renegades of the XFL. After playing college football for the Ole Miss Rebels, he signed with the Pittsburgh Steelers as an undrafted free agent in 2020. He also played for the San Francisco 49ers.

Professional career

Pittsburgh Steelers
Coatney signed with the Pittsburgh Steelers as an undrafted free agent following the 2020 NFL Draft on April 25, 2020. He was waived on August 2, 2020.

San Francisco 49ers
Coatney signed with the San Francisco 49ers' practice squad on October 7, 2020. He was released on October 28, and re-signed to the practice squad on November 5. He was elevated to the active roster on January 2, 2021, for the team's week 17 game against the Seattle Seahawks, and reverted to the practice squad after the game. He signed a reserve/future contract with the 49ers after the season on January 4, 2021. He was waived on April 27, 2021.

Arlington Renegades 
On November 17, 2022, Coatney was drafted by the Arlington Renegades of the XFL.

References

External links
San Francisco 49ers bio
Ole Miss Rebels football bio

1996 births
Living people
People from Douglasville, Georgia
Players of American football from Georgia (U.S. state)
American football defensive tackles
Ole Miss Rebels football players
Pittsburgh Steelers players
San Francisco 49ers players
Arlington Renegades players
Sportspeople from the Atlanta metropolitan area